Alexandra Martin (born 25 October 1968) is a French politician from The Republicans (LR) who has represented the 8th constituency of Alpes-Maritimes in the National Assembly since 2022.

See also 
 List of deputies of the 16th National Assembly of France

References 

Living people
1968 births
Deputies of the 16th National Assembly of the French Fifth Republic
21st-century French politicians
21st-century French women politicians
Women members of the National Assembly (France)
The Republicans (France) politicians
People from Nice